Sarah Ann Ludford, Baroness Ludford (born 14 March 1951) is a British-Irish Liberal Democrat politician and member of the House of Lords. She served as a Member of the European Parliament (MEP) for London from 1999 until 2014.

Early life and education
Ludworth was born in the Blyth Rural District of East Suffolk to an English father and an Irish mother and grew up in Hampshire. On a scholarship, she attended the independent school Portsmouth High School. She went on to graduate with a Bachelor of Science and a Master of Science, both from the London School of Economics. She subsequently qualified as a barrister, joining Gray's Inn in 1979.

Political career
Ludford was created a life peer as Baroness Ludford, of Clerkenwell in the London Borough of Islington on 30 September 1997, after serving as a Councillor for the London Borough of Islington 1991–99. She was elected MEP for London at the European Parliament election in 1999 and returned in 2004 and 2009, before losing her seat in 2014.

A 2008-rule change by the European Parliament initially prevented Ludford (like other Eurodeputies) from taking her seat in the House of Lords in the UK Parliament due to her re-election to the European Parliament in the 2009 election.

She remains a member of the Liberal Democrat groups Friends of Israel and Friends of Turkey.

Political positions
A longstanding opponent of capital punishment, Baroness Ludford has been pressing European drug companies not to supply executioners in the United States with sedatives.

Other activities
 Fair Trials International, Patron
 JUSTICE, Vice President

Personal life
Ludford lives in Islington. She was married to Steve Hitchins, Leader of Islington Borough Council (2000–06) until his death in September 2019.

References

External links

www.burkespeerage.com
Sarah Ludford MEP official site
Sarah Ludford profile at the European Parliament
 profile at the site of the Liberal Democrats

Living people
1951 births
20th-century women MEPs for England
21st-century women MEPs for England
Alumni of the London School of Economics
Councillors in the London Borough of Islington
Liberal Democrats (UK) life peers
Liberal Democrats (UK) MEPs
MEPs for England 1999–2004
MEPs for England 2004–2009
MEPs for England 2009–2014
People educated at Portsmouth High School (Southsea)
People from Halesworth
Politicians from Hampshire
Politicians from Suffolk
English people of Irish descent
Women councillors in England
Life peeresses created by Elizabeth II